Manoa Masi (born 18 August 1974) is a former Fijian professional footballer who played as a midfielder.

Masi is a cousin of Fijian football star Esala Masi and they have played together in Australia and the national team. His father, the late Esala Masi Sr. was also a Fiji international football player in the 1960s; he died in Lautoka Hospital in 2010.

International career
Masi made his debut for the Fiji national football team in 1998 against Australia and has collected over 15 caps.

References

External links
 

1974 births
Living people
Fijian footballers
Fiji international footballers
Fijian expatriate footballers
National Soccer League (Australia) players
Gippsland Falcons players
Ba F.C. players
I-Taukei Fijian people
Association football midfielders
1998 OFC Nations Cup players
2002 OFC Nations Cup players
Expatriate soccer players in Australia
Fijian expatriate sportspeople in Australia